Cristiano Rodeghiero (22 April 1915 – 23 September 1999) was an Italian cross-country skier who competed in the 1948 Winter Olympics. He was the older brother of Rizzieri Rodeghiero. In 1948 he finished 13th in the 50 km competition and 35th in the 18 km event.

References

External links
 

1915 births
1999 deaths
Italian male cross-country skiers
Olympic cross-country skiers of Italy
Cross-country skiers at the 1948 Winter Olympics